Les Kaine (8 August 1936 – 18 August 2012) was an Australian rules footballer who played for Hawthorn in the Victorian Football League (VFL).

Kaine started his career as a forward but was pushed into defence later in his career. He played a fullback in Hawthorn's winning Grand Final in 1961.

For the rest of the 1960s he played in the Bendigo Football League with Castlemaine and Kyneton. He was the league's leading goal-kicker while playing at Kyneton in 1966, with 84 goals.

References

External links

1936 births
Australian rules footballers from Victoria (Australia)
Hawthorn Football Club players
Hawthorn Football Club Premiership players
Castlemaine Football Club players
Kyneton Football Club players
Coleraine Football Club players
2012 deaths
One-time VFL/AFL Premiership players